The Empire Junior Hockey League (EmJHL) was a USA Hockey-sanctioned Tier III junior ice hockey league. The league was classified as Tier III Junior B until the 2011–12 season when USA Hockey combined the Tier III Junior A and Junior B classifications.

History
On February 25, 2010, the Empire Junior Hockey League Board of Governors voted to eliminate 20-year-old players from the League by changing the restriction of no more than four 20-year-olds per team to a maximum of two per team in the 2010–11 season. Starting with the 2011–12 season there would be no 20-year-olds in the league.

In 2013, the Empire League and the Eastern Elite Hockey League both agreed to affiliate with the newly formed United States Premier Hockey League becoming the Empire and Elite Divisions, respectively. Starting with the 2015–16 season the USPHL's Empire Division was renamed to the USP3 Division.

Participating teams
 
, the following teams made up the league in its final season:

Champions
 2012–13 Florida Junior Blades
 2011–12 New Hampshire Jr. Monarchs
 2010–11 New York Apple Core
 2009–10 New Hampshire Jr. Monarchs
 2008–09 Boston Jr. Bruins
 2007–08 Boston Jr. Bruins
 2006–07 Boston Jr. Bruins

References

External links
Official EJHL Web site

Junior ice hockey leagues in the United States